Michael Antonio Lepe Labraña (born August 13, 1990) is a Chilean footballer currently playing for Deportes Antofagasta of the Primera Division in Chile.

Career statistics

References

External links
 
 

1990 births
Living people
Chilean footballers
Chilean Primera División players
Universidad de Concepción footballers
C.D. Antofagasta footballers
Association football midfielders